The .38 Long Colt, also known as .38 LC, is a black powder cartridge introduced by Colt's Manufacturing Company in 1875. In 1892, it was adopted as a standard military pistol cartridge by the United States Army for the Colt M1892 revolver.  The metric designation for the .38 Long Colt is 9.1×26mm. It is slightly more powerful than the .38 Short Colt, also known as .38 SC. The original .38 SC and .38 LC differ in case length, bullet diameter, weight, and design and are not interchangeable; however, modern production .38 SC ammunition is now loaded with a smaller, internally-lubricated bullet which can be fired from firearms chambered in .38 LC or .38 Special. The modern .38 LC can be fired from .38 Special firearm, but not from a firearm designed for the .38 SC, since the case length is too long.

Design and ballistics

A smaller-diameter portion of the bullet, the "heel", was crimped inside the case mouth, and the lubricant was outside the case, and exposed.

In contrast, the .38 Long Colt uses a bullet which on the outside of the cartridge case is only , the bearing surface and lubricant being entirely contained within the case. This kept the waxy lubricant from collecting grit which can damage the revolver's barrel. Colt, however, retained the single-diameter charge hole, resulting in the bullet failing to form a seal as it traveled through the chamber throat. This seal was expected to cause the bullet to expand in the throat and be "swaged down", or reduced again in diameter, as it entered the barrel, but uneven expansion produced poor accuracy.

History and usage
The cartridge's relatively poor ballistics were highlighted during the Philippine–American War of 1899–1902, when reports from U.S. Army officers were received regarding the .38 bullet's inability to stop charges of frenzied Moro juramentados during the Moro Rebellion, even at extremely close ranges. A typical instance occurred in 1905 and was later recounted by Colonel Louis A. LaGarde:

Antonio Caspi, a prisoner on the island of Samar, P.I. attempted escape on Oct. 26, 1905. He was shot four times at close range in a hand-to-hand encounter by a .38 Colt's revolver loaded with U.S. Army regulation ammunition. He was finally stunned by a blow on the forehead from the butt end of a Springfield carbine.

Col. LaGarde noted Caspi's wounds were fairly well-placed: three bullets entered the chest, perforating the lungs. One passed through the body, one lodged near the back and the other lodged in subcutaneous tissue. The fourth round went through the right hand and exited through the forearm.

As an emergency response to the round's unexpectedly dismal performance, the U.S. Army authorized officers to carry M1873 Colt Single Action Army revolvers, chambered in .45 Colt, and issued from reserve stocks. Army Ordnance also purchased a number of M1902 revolvers (the M1902 was an improved version of Colt's Double Action Army Model 1878, a .45-caliber rod-ejector double-action revolver) for issue to officers deploying overseas.

The .38 Long Colt remained the Army's primary revolver cartridge until 1909, when the .45 M1909 cartridge was issued along with the .45 Colt New Service revolver as the new standard military sidearm for the U.S. Army. However, some of the old .38 Long Colt revolvers and ammunition remained in reserve stocks, and when the U.S. entered World War I in 1917, the need for sidearms was such that even these low-performing weapons were brought out of storage for usage away from the front lines.

In civilian use, the .38 LC was chambered in a number of Colt revolvers and saw some use among target shooters. Various U.S. police forces also adopted the cartridge. However, the cartridge became nearly extinct after Smith & Wesson's more powerful .38 Special cartridge became widely popular as a civilian and police service cartridge. By 1908, even Colt was chambering their new Police Positive and Army Special revolvers in ".38 Colt Special", which was just a standard .38 Smith & Wesson Special with a different headstamp.

See also
9 mm caliber
Table of handgun and rifle cartridges

Notes

Sources
 Official U.S. Army description of the original Army Model 1892 revolver, including its .38 Long Colt ammunition.
 Revised U.S. Army description of the M1892 series of revolvers and their .38 Long Colt ammunition. (Note this description has an updated cartridge and higher muzzle velocity, but the other ballistics and trajectory data values are unchanged from the 1893 description and must be considered as only approximate for the newer revolvers and cartridges.)

References

External links

Ballistics By The Inch .38 Long Colt Results.

38 Long Colt
Colt cartridges